Estadio Argelio Sabillón is a multi-purpose stadium in Santa Bárbara, Honduras.  It is currently used mostly for football matches and is the home stadium of Real Juventud.  The stadium holds 5 000 people.

The stadium is named after famous Honduran referee Argelio Sabillón, who resides in the area.

The stadium's pitch deteriorated during the break in 2020 but was quickly repaired by authorities.

References

Argelio Sabillon
Multi-purpose stadiums in Honduras